Exhibition of Speed is a racing game developed by Player 1 and Titus Interactive and published by Virgin Interactive for the Dreamcast in 2001.

Gameplay 

The game offers Trophy (consisting of three championships), Quick Race, Time Trial and Multiplayer modes. Over 20 vehicles and 15 tracks are included, with varying weather conditions across tracks.

Development 
The title is a follow-up to Roadsters, released on the Nintendo 64 in 1999, and for PlayStation, Dreamcast and Game Boy Color in 2000.

Reception 
The title was reviewed poorly, with critics pointing to a lack of variety among game modes, rubber banding and poor vehicle handling. Steve Key, writing in Official Dreamcast Magazine, rated it a 2/10. Dreamcast Magazine's Alex Warren decried the game's "distressingly poor graphical quality", "disturbingly bad frame rate", "particularly foul draw-distance" and "equally abominable gameplay", giving a score of 35/100. Martin Woger, the Editor-in-Chief of Eurogamer.de, placed Exhibition of Speed in second place in his list of the seven worst Dreamcast games of all time.

References 

2001 video games
Dreamcast games
Racing video games